The Azerbaijan Basketball League is the top men's professional basketball league in Azerbaijan.

Clubs
Updated on March 20, 2020.

Champions

References

External links
 Eurobasket.com League Page

Basketball in Azerbaijan